Annabelle's Affairs is a 1931 American pre-Code romantic comedy film directed by Alfred L. Werker and starring Victor McLaglen, Jeanette MacDonald and Roland Young. The film is based on the 1916-17 play Good Gracious Annabelle by Clare Kummer. It is the only one of MacDonald's films to be considered lost. It was well received by critics, but did not perform well at the box office.

Plot
After they are separated shortly after their marriage, Annabelle doesn't really know what her husband looks like. When they meet later she finds herself falling in love with him, without realizing that they are already married.

Cast
 Victor McLaglen as John Rawson / Hefly Jack 
 Jeanette MacDonald as Annabelle Leigh  
 Roland Young as Roland Wimbleton 
 Sam Hardy as James Ludgate  
 William Collier Sr. as Wickham  
 Sally Blane as Dora 
 Joyce Compton as Mabel 
 Ruth Warren as Lottie  
 George Beranger as Archie  
 Walter Walker as Walter J. Gosling  
 Hank Mann as Summers  
 Jed Prouty as Bolson  
 Louise Beavers as Ruby 
 Wilbur Mack as Vance, assistant hotel manager

See also
List of lost films

References

Bibliography
 Turk, Edward Baron. Hollywood Diva: A Biography of Jeanette MacDonald. University of California Press, 1998.

External links

1931 films
American romantic comedy films
1931 romantic comedy films
Films directed by Alfred L. Werker
American films based on plays
Fox Film films
American black-and-white films
Lost American films
1931 lost films
Lost romantic comedy films
1930s English-language films
1930s American films
Silent romantic comedy films